Marita Skogh (born December 29, 1956) is a Swedish sprint canoer who competed in the late 1970s. She was eliminated in the repechages of the K-1 500 m event at the 1976 Summer Olympics in Montreal.

References
Sports-reference.com profile

External links

1956 births
Canoeists at the 1976 Summer Olympics
Living people
Olympic canoeists of Sweden
Swedish female canoeists
Place of birth missing (living people)